Wayne Odesnik is the defending champion, but lost in the second round this year.
Brian Baker won the title, defeating Augustin Gensse 6–4, 6–3 in the final.

Seeds

Draw

Finals

Top half

Bottom half

References
 Main draw
 Qualifying draw

2012 ATP Challenger Tour
2012 Singles